China Policy Review (CPR), formerly known as China Economic Report, is a monthly magazine of the Development Research Center of the State Council.  It was originally designed as an internal economic report for the State Council to disperse ideas and opinion throughout government, but since January 2006 it is circulated to the public.  The current circulation of the periodical is roughly 100,000 issues per month. Members of the editorial board of CPR include top Chinese economists and decision-makers. It mainly covers issues of China's economy, policy, politics, international relations, technology, and culture. It serves as a key economic reference for government at all levels, investment companies and research institutions within China.

Numerous former national leaders, ministers, professors and other experts have been featured in previous issues of CPR, including: Nobel Prize Laureate Edmund S. Phelps; Futurist John Nesbitt; Guinean President Alpha Condé; and Deputy Central Bank Governor of Japan Kiyohiko Nishimura.

Major sections
 Macroeconomy and finance
 Business and industry
 Public policy
 Regional focus
 International
 Innovation and china
 Culture

References

External links 
 http://www.guozhicn.cn
 CPR on Sina Weibo

Monthly magazines published in China
Political magazines published in China
Magazines with year of establishment missing
Magazines published in Beijing